The 1944–45 Fort Wayne Zollner Pistons season was the fourth season of the franchise in the National Basketball League. The team was led by the star backcourt of 2 time league MVP Bobby McDermott and Buddy Jeannette. The season ended with the Pistons winning a league best 25 out of 30 games and McDermott being awarded his third MVP award. As of 2019 this is still the best record in franchise history. The playoffs began with a 2-0 sweep over the Cleveland Allmen Transfers to make the team's fourth straight NBL Championship series. There they were met by the Sheboygan Redskins for the third straight year. The series went to a full five games but ended with Fort Wayne defeating Sheboygan to successfully defend their NBL Championship. The Pistons would not return to the finals for another decade and would not win another championship until the 1989 NBA Finals. At the end of the season  Blackie Towery left the team to join the military for World War II, however he would return one season later.

Roster

League standings

Eastern Division

Western Division

Awards and honors
Robert McDermott won the NBL MVP award for the third straight season.

References

Fort Wayne Zollner Pistons seasons
Fort Wayne
National Basketball League (United States) championship seasons
Fort Wayne Zollner Pistons
Fort Wayne Zollner Pistons